The Battle of Entrames was fought on 27 October 1793 during the French Revolutionary Wars. It pitted Republican forces against Vendée Royalists near Entrames in Mayenne, and it resulted in a Royalist victory.

References 

Battles of the War in the Vendée
Battles involving France
Battles in Pays de la Loire
History of Mayenne
1793 in France